Letpatan or Letpadan is a town in Tharrawaddy District, Pegu region in Burma (Myanmar). It is the administrative seat of Letpadan Township.

References

External links
"Letpatan Map — Satellite Images of Letpatan" Maplandia

Township capitals of Myanmar

Populated places in Bago Region